Futurism is a modernist avant-garde movement in literature and part of the Futurism art movement that originated in Italy in the early 20th century. It made its official literature debut with the publication of Filippo Tommaso Marinetti's Manifesto of Futurism (1909). Futurist poetry is characterised by unexpected combinations of images and by its hyper-concision (in both economy of speech and actual length). Futurist theatre also played an important role within the movement and is distinguished by scenes that are only a few sentences long, an emphasis on nonsensical humour, and attempts to examine and subvert traditions of theatre via parody and other techniques. Longer forms of literature, such as the novel, have no place in the Futurist aesthetic of speed and compression. Futurist literature primarily focuses on seven aspects: intuition, analogy, irony, abolition of syntax, metrical reform, onomatopoeia, and essential/synthetic lyricism.

Methodology

Intuition 

In Marinetti's 1909 manifesto, Marinetti calls for the reawakening of "divine intuition" that "after hours of relentless toil" allows for the "creative spirit seems suddenly to shake off its shackles and become prey to an incomprehensible spontaneity of conception and execution".

Soffici had a more earthly reasoning. Intuition was the means by which creation took place. He believed that there could be no abstraction of the values of futurist literature in logical terms. Rather, art was a language in and of itself that could only be expressed in that language. Any attempt to extrapolate from the literature resulted "in the evaluation not of artistic qualities but of extraneous matters". As such, the spontaneous creation brought by intuition freed one from abstracting (and therefore adding erroneous material into the literature) and allowed on to speak in the language of art.

In this way, Futurists rallied against "intellectualistic literature…[and] intelligible poetry".  However, this idea is different from anti-intellectualism. They were not hostile to intellectual approaches, but just the specific intellectual approach that poetry had taken for so many years. Therefore, they often rejected any form of tradition as it had been tainted with the previous intellectual approaches of the past.

Analogy 

Analogy's purpose in Futurist writing was to show that everything related to one another. They helped to unveil this true reality lying underneath the surface of existence. That is to say, despite what the experience might show one, everything is in fact interconnected. The more startling the comparison, the more successful it is.

The means for creating these analogies is intuition. This intuition is "the poet's peculiar quality in that it enables him to discover analogies which, hidden to reason, are yet the essentials of art". The discovering of analogies is made possible by intuition.

Now, Marinetti believed that analogies have always existed, but earlier poets had not reached out enough to bring appropriately disparate entities together. By creating a communion of two (or more) seemingly unrelated objects, the poet pierces to the "essence of reality". The farther the poet has to reach in terms of logical remoteness is in direct proportion to its efficacy.

As analogy thus plays such an important role, it "offers a touchstone to gauge poetical values…: the power to startle. The artistic criterion derived from analogy is stupefaction". While an ordinary person's vision is colored by convention and tradition, the poet can brush away this top layer to reveal the reality below. The process of communicating the surprise is art while the "stupefaction" is the reaction to this discovery. Thus, analogies are the essence of poetry for the Futurists.

Irony 

As the Futurists advocated the aforementioned intuition and the bucking of tradition, one might assume that they would suppress the use of irony. On the contrary, irony proved to be "so old and forgotten that it looked almost new when the dust was brushed away from it. What was new and untried, at least more so than their principles and theories, were the futurists' stylistic devices".

Abolition of syntax 

Futurists believed that the constraints of syntax were inappropriate to modern life and that it did not truly represent the mind of the poet. Syntax would act as a filter in which analogies had to be processed and so analogies would lose their characteristic "stupefaction." By abolishing syntax, the analogies would become more effective. 
The practical realization of this ideal meant that many parts of speech were discarded: Adjectives were thought to bring nuance in "a universe which is…black and white"; the infinitive provided all the idea of an action one needed without the hindrances of conjugation; substantives followed their linked substantives without other words (by the notion of analogy). Punctuation, moods, and tenses, also disappeared in order to be consistent with analogy and "stupefaction."

However, the Futurists were not truly abolishing syntax. White points out that since "The OED defines 'syntax' as 'the arrangement of words in their proper forms' by which their connection and relation in a sentence are shown". The Futurists were not destroying syntax in that sense. Marinetti in truth advocated a number of "substantial, but nevertheless selective modifications to existing syntax" and that the "Russian Futurists' idea that they were 'shaking syntax loose'" is more accurate.

Metrical reform 

Early Futurist poetry relied on free verse as their poetical vehicle. However, free verse "was too thoroughly bound up with tradition and too fond of producing…stale effects" to be effective. Furthermore, by using free verse, the Futurist realized they would be working under the rules of syntax and therefore interfering with intuition and inspiration.

In order to break free of the shackles of meter, they resorted to what they called "parole in libertá (word autonomy)". Essentially, all ideas of meter were rejected and the word became the main unit of concern instead of the meter. In this way, the Futurists managed to create a new language free of syntax punctuation, and metrics that allowed for free expression.

For example, in the poem entitled "Studio" by Soffici, he "describes the artist's studio—and by extension, modern man himself—as becoming a 'radiotelefantastic cabin open to all messages', the sense of wonder her being transmitted by the portmanteau neologism: 'readotelefantastica'". Here all notions of familiar language have been abandoned and in their place a new language has emerged with its own vocabulary.

Onomatopoeia 
There were four forms of onomatopoeia that the Futurists advocated: direct, indirect, integral, and abstract. The first of these four is the usually onomatopoeia seen in typical poetry, e.g. boom, splash, tweet. They convey the most realistic translation of sound into language. Indirect onomatopoeia "expressed the subjective responses to external conditions".

Integral onomatopoeia was "the introduction of any and every sound irrespective of its similarity to significant words". This meant that any collection of letters could represent a sound. The final form of onomatopoeia did not reference external sounds or movements like the aforementioned versions of onomatopoeia. Rather, they tried to capture the internal motions of the soul.

Essential/synthetic lyricism 

In order to better provide stark, contrasting, analogies, the Futurist literature promoted a kind of hyper-conciseness. It was dubbed essential and synthetic lyricism. The former refers to a paring down of any and all superfluous objects while the latter expresses an unnatural compactness of the language unseen elsewhere. This idea explains where poetry became the preferred literary medium of Futurism and why there are no Futurist novels (since novels are neither pared down nor compressed).

Futurism in the theatre 

Traditional theatre often served as a target for Futurists because of its deep roots in classical societies. In its stead, the Futurists exalted the variety theatre, vaudeville, and music hall because, they argued, it "had no tradition; it was a recent discovery". Vaudevillian acts aligned themselves well to the notions of "stupefaction" as there was the desire to surprise and excite the audience. Furthermore, the heavy use of machinery attracted the Futurists, as well as Vaudevillian acts' tendency to "destroy" the masterpieces of the past through parody and other forms of depreciation.

By adding other Futurist ideals mentioned above, they firmly rooted their beliefs into theatre. They wanted to blur the line between art and life in order to reach below the surface to reality. In practice, this manifested itself in various ways:

"Collaboration between the public and the actors was to be developed to the point of indistinction of roles—such cooperating confusion was to be partly impromptu…e.g. chairs were to be covered with glue so that ladies' gowns would stick to them; and tickets sold in such a way as to bring side by side men of the extreme right and those of the extreme left, prudes and prostitutes, teachers and pupils. Sneezing powders, sudden darkening of the hall, and alarm signals were all means to insure the proper functioning of this universal human farce".

However, the most important aspect of the work was the discrediting of the great works of theatre. These new theatrical ideal of the Futurists helped to establish a new genre of theatre: the synthetic play.

Synthetic play 

This type of play took the idea of compression to an extreme, where "a brief performance in which entire acts were reduced to a few sentences, and scenes to a handful of words. No sentiments, no psychological development, no atmosphere, no suggestiveness. Common sense was banished, or rather, replaced by nonsense". There did exist some plays similar to this before the Futurists, but they did not conform to the Futurist agenda. The creator of the first modern synthetic play is thought to be Verlaine, with his aptly titled work Excessive Haste.

Examples

Excerpt from Marinetti's free verse poem To a Racing Car

Veemente dio d’una razza d’acciaio,
Automobile ebbra di spazio,
che scalpiti e fremi d’angoscia
rodendo il morso con striduli denti
Formidabile mostro giapponese,
dagli occhi di fucina,
nutrito di fiamma
e d’olî minerali,
avido d’orizzonti, di prede siderali
Io scateno il tuo cuore che tonfa diabolicamente,
scateno i tuoi giganteschi pneumatici,
per la danza che tu sai danzare
via per le bianche strade di tutto il mondo!

Vehement god from a race of steel,
Automobile drunk with space,
Trampling with anguish, bit between your strident teeth!
O formidable Japanese monster with forge,
Nourished with flame and mineral oils,
Hungry for horizons and sidereal prey,
I unleash your heart to the diabolical vroom-vroom
And your giant radials, for the dance
You lead on the white roads of the world.

Farfa's parole in Libertá poem Triangle

they were three three
the he and the other the other
and the other was a real triangle a true
younger brother of the file
of steel rusty stell
that he in the frenzy
of possession only his only his alone
seized abruptly and thrust theeeeere
into the pure white velvet of her belly
plugging her new opening with his flesh
with his virile flesh
ah ah ah
ahh ahh ahh
ahe haaaahh

List of futurist poets by region

Czechoslovakia

 Stanislav Kostka Neumann
 Vítězslav Nezval
 Jaroslav Seifert

Italy

 Libero Altomare
 Paolo Buzzi
 Enrico Cardile
 Loris Catrizzi
 Enrico Cavacchioli
 Auroa D'Alba
 Escodame
 Farfa
 Fillia
 Luciano Folgore
 F.T. Marinetti
 Armando Mazza
 Bruno G. Sanzin

Poland

 Tytus Czyżewski
 Jan Hrynkowski
 Jerzy Jankowski
 Bruno Jasieński
 Anatol Stern
 Aleksander Wat
 Stanisław Młodożeniec

Russia

 Nikolay Aseev
 Bozhidar
 Vasily Kamensky
 Velemir Khlebnikov
 Aleksey Kruchenykh
 Vladimir Mayakovsky
 Vadim Shershenevich

Slovenia

 Srecko Kosovel
 Anton Podbevšek
 Vladimir Premru

Portugal and Brazil 

 Mário de Andrade
 Tyrteu Rocha Vianna
 Álvaro de Campos
 Mário de Sá-Carneiro
 Sérgio Milliet
 Almada Negreiros

Ukraine 
 David Burliuk
 Vasyl Aleshko
 Mykola Bazhan, former member of Komunkult
 Oleksa Slisarenko, former member of Komunkult
 Mykhailo Semenko
 Mykhailo Yalovy, former member of Komunkult

England

Mina Loy

Lithuania
 Kazys Binkis

References
 Looking Back at Futurism. Clough, Rosa Trillo. 1942, Cocce Press, New York.
 Literary Futurism: Aspects of the First Avant Garde. White, John J. 1990, Clarendon Press, Oxford.
 Futurism and Its place in the development of Modern Poetry: A Comparative Study and Anthology. Folejewski, Zbigniew. 1980, University of Ottawa Press, Ottawa.

Futurism

Literature